The 1994 Richmond Spiders football team was an American football team that represented the University of Richmond as a member of the Yankee Conference during the 1994 NCAA Division I-AA football season. In their sixth season under head coach Jim Marshall, Richmond compiled a 3–8 record, with a mark of 1–7 in conference play, finishing in sixth place in the Mid-Atlantic division of the Yankee.

Schedule

References

Richmond
Richmond Spiders football seasons
Richmond Spiders